The VCU Rams men's basketball teams represented Virginia Commonwealth University in Richmond, Virginia, United States. The program was established in 1967, and began play in the 1968–69 season. This article is a list of results and statistics of the men's basketball team from the 1968–69 season to the 1978–79 season during which the team played as an NCAA Independent.

1968–69 

The 1968–69 VCU Rams men's basketball team represented the newly created Virginia Commonwealth University during the 1968–69 NCAA men's basketball season. Led by Benny Dees, the Rams played their inaugural season as an independent team, playing a mix of Division I, II and III schools across the Mid-Atlantic, Ohio River Valley and Southeast regions. After an 0–4 start, the Rams finished the season with a winning record of 12–11.  During the season, they played in two winter tournaments; the Fort Eustis and Quantico tournaments held at Virginia military bases, Joint Base Langley–Eustis and Marine Corps Base Quantico, respectively. The team did not earn a berth into either the NCAA or NIT tournaments.

During the team's inaugural season, the Rams played in the Franklin Street Gymnasium, which was their home arena until the opening of the Siegel Center in the late 1990s.

1969–70

1970–71

1971–72

1972–73

1973–74

1974–75

1975–76

1976–77

1977–78

1978–79

NBA Draft selections

Notes 

1968-1979